Çekmeköy is a district in the Asian suburbs of Istanbul, Turkey. It became a district in 2009 by secession from Ümraniye. Also; Ömerli, Alemdağ, and Taşdelen villages, 17 quarter and four towns joined Çekmeköy district in the same year. Its first mayor, Ahmet Poyraz, was elected in the 2009 Turkish local elections from (AKP).

References

 
Populated places in Istanbul Province
Districts of Istanbul Province